Chennai Corporation Schools are run by the Education Department, Corporation of Chennai, Tamil Nadu, India. Name of Chennai Corporation Schools has changed as Chennai Schools from the year 2010.

See also
Education in Bangladesh

Schools in Chennai

Bangladesh University of Business and Technology